Kas Oosterhuis (1951) is a Dutch architect, professor and co-founder of the innovation studio ONL together with visual artist Ilona Lénárd. He was a professor at Delft University of Technology (TU Delft) from 2000 to 2016 and has been a professor at Qatar University since 2017. His office, ONL, has realized a number of innovative, contemporary architecture projects including the Salt Water Pavilion at Neeltje Jans, the Web of North Holland at the 2002 World Expo in Haarlemmermeer, the A2 Cockpit in the Sounder Barrier at Leidsche Rijn, Utrecht and the Liwa Tower in Abu Dhabi.

Biography
Kas Oosterhuis studied architecture at Delft University of Technology from 1970 to 1979. His final studio project, the "Strook Door Nederland" under the mentorship of Rem Koolhaas was a proposal for a radical urban scheme concentrating all future building activities in the large 5 km wide and 200 km long strip, leaving the rest of holland to develop into a jungle. His first commission was to design a 1:20 scale villa with LEGO bricks. In 1991 he completed his first housing project the Patiowoningen at the Dedemsvaartweg, and urban design scheme by OMA. From the beginning of their practice Kas Oosterhuis worked closely together with his partner in life and business visual artist Ilona Lénárd, their artistic and architectural DNA strings would regularly interlace in joint projects. In 2000 Kas Oosterhuis accepted a 0.4 fte professorship at the Faculty of Architecture at the TU Delft. Kas Oosterhuis has become known internationally for his radical digital approach to architecture as from the earliest design stages up to the computer numerical controlled production of the building components, of which process the A2 Cockpit in the Sound Barrier is a prime example. Kas Oosterhuis has won and subsequently built two important international competitions: the Bálna Budapest and the LIWA tower in Abu Dhabi. Between 1990 and now Kas Oosterhuis has delivered hundreds of lectures worldwide at universities and conferences. As from September 2017 Kas Oosterhuis has accepted a full professorship at the Qatar University in Doha.

Fusion of Art and Architecture on a digital platform
Between 1988 and 1989 Kas Oosterhuis and Ilona Lénárd lived and worked one year in the Van Doesburg studio-house in Meudon near Paris. In that year they decided to bring their art and architecture work together in a joint practice, under the motto of “The Fusion of Art and Architecture on a Digital Platform”. In their early years of coöperation they organized the events Artificial Intuition (1990, Berlin), The Synthetic Dimension (1991,  Amersfoort), Sculpture City (1994, Ram Gallery Rotterdam), and realized 20 public art and architectural projects: the inflatable weblounge ParaSITE (1996, Rotterdam Festivals), the Musicsculpture in Oldemarkt (1998), the TT Monument in Assen (2002), housing projects Patio Housing The Hague (1991, Dedemsvaartweg) and De Kassen (1991), where Ilona Lénárd mapped colorful dazzle paintings on the entire facade, the housing project Dancing Facades (1992) in De Hunze in Groningen, the Waterpavilion (1997) at Neeltje Jans, featuring the complex Hydra structure on the basis of an intuitive 3d computer sketch, and later the housing project Fside (2007) in Amsterdam. Ilona Lénárd, born and educated in Hungary, was also instrumental in setting up the ONL Hungary office (2007 - 2017) in Budapest to realize the Bálna Budapest, originally named the CET Budapest, and to enter a number of competition projects among others the City Hall competition Budapest (2008, third prize).

Design to production
Kas Oosterhuis aims at "changing the building industry from within" by his digital design to manufacturing approach, which was developed with the design of the Waterpavilion (1997, Neeltje Jans). Kas Oosterhuis and his team teamed up with the steel manufacturer and invented a direct file to factory procedure, producing only those data that the CNC machines of the steel manufacturer needs to produce the building components from the raw material. Autolisp routines were used for the data exchange. For the Web of North-Holland (2002) ONL used a variety of programs, including 3d digitizing the handcrafted model, Maya for the digital 3d model and the construction of the complex geometry, and Autolisp routines for extracting the data needed for the cutting of the steel plates. The A2 Cockpit in the Sound Barrier the step was fully scripted, therewith replacing 3d modeling as the leading design tool for computer programming. Before the term parametric design became popular in the last decade as propagated by among others Patrik Schumacher of ZHA, ONL practiced parametric design as from the design to production procedure of the Waterpavilion in 1997. One of the advantages of the digital design to production procedures is that it allows for an affordable complexity, whereas the constituting components have their own unique dimensions and shape. Design to production methods facilitate mass customization of the building components, producing series of one.

Hyperbody TU Delft
Kas Oosterhuis accepted in the year 2000 a 0,4 fte professorship (professor from practice) at the Faculty of Architecture at the TU Delft. He renamed the chair of Digital Architecture into Hyperbody. Hyperbody specialized in Nonstandard Architecture and Interactive Architecture. Up to 2017 Hyperbody has run a master design course delivering students with hands-on design programming skills. Hyperbody has accepted a dozen PHD candidates between 2002 and 2015, among them Dr Henriette Bier and Dr Nimish Biloria, who joined Hyperbody as assistant professors in 2007. Hyperbody alumni found their way into internationally renowned offices like Foster and Partners, Zaha Hadid Architects and Heatherwick Studio, and nationally into the offices of UN Studio,  Cepezed] and ONL, or founded their own practices.

Publications
Kas Oosterhuis has written and/or edited 16 books explaining his visionary view on digital architecture, the most well known books are Programmable Architecture (2000, L’Arcaedizioni), Architecture Goes Wild (2001, 010 Publishers), Hyperbodies, towards an Emotive Architecture (2003, Birkhäuser), ONLogic, Speed and Vision (2008, Images Publishing), and Towards A New Kind of Building (2011, Nai Publishers), a designer's guide to nonstandard architecture. Kas Oosterhuis is editor in chief of the scientific journal Next Generation Building (founded 2001, Baltzer Publishers, TU Delft), and has organized a series of Game Set and Match conferences at the TU Delft (GSM I in 2002, GSM II in 2006, GSM III in 2016). Kas Oosterhuis was editor in chief of the Game Set and Match books, edited the book Hyperbody, First Decade of Interactive Architecture (2012, Jap Sam Books), and edited the book series Interactive Architecture iA#1, iA#2, iA#3, iA#4, and iA#5 (2006 - 2012, Jap Sam Books).

History 
 2005 ONL*NUT joint office, Nanjing University of Technology, Nanjing China
 2003 office name changed to ONL [Oosterhuis_Lénárd] BV
 from 2000 professor Technical University Delft
 1989 founding Kas Oosterhuis Architekten
 1988/1989 living/working in studio Theo van Doesburg in Paris [with Ilona Lénárd]
 1987/1989 Unit Master AA London
 1970/1979 TU Delft architecture
 1951 born in Amersfoort 4 July

Awards 
 2007 Dutch Design Prize [Cockpit in Acoustic Barrier]
 2007 National Steel Prize [Cockpit in Acoustic Barrier]
 2007 Mies van der Rohe award nomination [Cockpit in Acoustic Barrier]
 2006 Funda Award [Hessing Cockpit in Acoustic Barrier]
 2005 Proholz Prize, Austria [Schmetterling Wingman]
 2002 European Aluminium Award nomination  [TT Monument and Web of North*Holland]
 1999 Mies van der Rohe award nomination [Saltwaterpavilion]
 1999 National Steelprize nomination [Saltwaterpavilion]
 1998 Business Week / Architectural Record Award [Garbagetransferstation Elhorst/ Vloedbelt]
 1998 Zeeuwse Architectuurprijs [Saltwaterpavilion]
 1996 OCÉBNA Prize for industrial architecture [Garbagetransferstation Elhorst/ Vloedbelt]
 1996 National Steelprize honorable mention [Garbagetransferstation Elhorst/ Vloedbelt]

Projects 
 2007 CET Budapest, Budapest, Hungary 
 2007 Landmark, Kaiserslautern Germany
 2007 Capital Centre, Abu Dhabi United Arab Emirates
 2007 Dubai Sports City, Dubai United Arab Emirates
 2007 Drents Museum, Assen the Netherlands
 2007 F side, 56 houses Bijlmermeer Amsterdam
 2007 BMW Ekris Headlights
 2006 iWeb TU Delft
 2006 Digital Pavilion, Seoul South Korea
 2006 Acoustic Barrier
 2005 Hessing Cockpit
 2005 Masterplan Automotive Complex
2003 NSA Muscle project
 2002 Web of North-Holland Floriade
 2002 TT Monument
 2000 8*Bit Housing
 1998 Family Zoetermeer
 1998 TGV Housing
 1997 Saltwaterpavilion Neeltje Jans Zeeland
 1997 Music sculpture
 1995 Dancing Facades
 1995 Elhorst / Vloedbelt Garbagetransferstation
 1994 Daken Housing
 1994 Dijken Housing
 1993 De Kassen Kattenbroek
 1991 Drive-in Patio Housing the Hague
 1991 Villa Hutten
 1987 BRN Catering

Writings 
 2007 iA # 1 Interactive Architecture (bookzine), Episode Publishers Rotterdam
 2006 ONL monography, Images publishers Australia
 2006 ONL Hyperbody Logic, AADCU publisher, Beijing, China
 2006 GameSetandMatch II, Episode Publisher
 2004 BCN Speed and Friction, ESARQ Barcelona
 2004 Gamesetandmatch, TU Delft
 2003 hyperbodies towards an e*motive architecture Birkhäuser Verlag
 2002 architecture goes wild 010 publishers
 2002 programmable architecture l’ARCAEDIZIONI
 2001 Emotive Architecture Inaugural Speech, Faculty of Architecture TU Delft
 1999 vectorial bodies archis 6/99
 1998 Kas Oosterhuis architect Ilona Lénárd visual artist 010 publishers
 1995 sculpture city book+cd rom 010 publishers
 1990 the open volume wiederhall 12

Exhibitions 
 2006 City Scape 2006, Dubai International Exhibition Centre Dubai
 2006 Dutch Pavilion, the Big 5, Dubai International Exhibition Centre, Dubai
 2006 ONL Architects Solo Exhibition at the Suzhou Creek Warehouse, Shanghai
 2006 The 4th Shanghai International City Garden & Landscape Design Exhibition, Shanghai
 2006 Sketch presented on exhibition 'A sketch for London', the London Architecture Biennale
 2006 DIAF Festival, Beijing
 2006 Exhibition YearbookArchitecture in the Netherlands 2005/2006, Zutphen
 2005 ONL*NUT architecture design Nanjing China
 2005 'Avenir de Ville', Nancy, France
 2005 mobilion, Rijkswaterstaat, Utrecht
 2005 tradecom Dubai
 2004 Archilab
 2004 algorithmic revolution Karlsruhe
 2004 digital fabricators exhibition London
 2004 La Biennale, 9th International Architecture Exhibition, Venice
 2003 Non-Standard Architecture Centre Pompidou Paris
 2003 abc Haarlem
 2003 Leblac Brussels
 2003 Biennale Valencia
 2003 Parasite paradise Utrecht
 2002 Architekturmuseum München
 2001 Blobmeister DAM Frankfurt
 2001 Archilab III
 2000 Biennale Venice (with Ilona Lénárd)
 1999 Archilab I frac centre Orléans
 1998 Smart materials AA London
 1998 Transarchitectures03 NAi Rotterdam
 1985 Architecture in LEGO Centre Pompidou Paris

References

External links 

oosterhuis.nl
hyperbody.nl
lenard.nl/
Saltwater Pavilion, Neeltje Jans Zeeland, 1997, Frac Centre
Finding aid for the ONL [Oosterhuis_Lénárd] NSA Muscle project records, Canadian Centre for Architecture (e-publication)
https://www.mckn.eu/wiki/home/

20th-century Dutch architects
People from Amersfoort
1951 births
Living people
Delft University of Technology alumni
Academic staff of the Delft University of Technology
21st-century Dutch architects